Fallsington is an unincorporated community in Falls Township, Bucks County, Pennsylvania, United States.

Geography
The latitude of Fallsington is 40.187N. The longitude is -74.819W.

It is in the Eastern Standard time zone.

History
Fallsington is an example of a crossroads community typical of the 18th century, on the Kings Highway (now U.S. Route 13). The Bucks County Courthouse, established in 1663, is said to have been located in Fallsington until it was moved to Bristol in 1705. The first meetings of the Religious Society of Friends were held in the home of William Biles on Biles Island.  Falls Monthly Meeting found a site for the first brick meetinghouse built in Fallsington, about 1690, on 6 acres (0.024 km2) of land that had been donated by Samuel Burgess. Also in 1690, Thomas Janney donated 72 acres (0.29 km2) of land to be used as the Quaker burial grounds for Falls Monthly Meeting. William Penn donated a tract of 120 acres (0.49 km2), for a Falls commons.

Fallsington evolved through a succession of periods in American history and architecture.  Significant homes in Fallsington range from the late 17th century through the Victorian era of the mid-19th century. Fallsington was a center of commerce. A business directory of the 1860s listed blacksmiths, a butcher, carpenters, a carriage builder, a cooper, farmers, an insurance agent, machinists, physicians, a surveyor, and a wheelwright.

The growth of Fallsington continued, with the construction of homes, an inn, public buildings, stores, and small craftsmen's shops. Until the construction of Fairless Hills and Levittown, it was the largest settlement in the Township, and functioned for many years as a commercial center.

The Fallsington Historic District was listed on the National Register of Historic Places in 1972.

Trivia
The "falls" of the Delaware River is not a dramatic waterfall but, rather, the rapids that mark the highest navigable point on the river. The names of Fallsington and Falls Township derive from it.

References

External links
 Historic Fallsington

Unincorporated communities in Bucks County, Pennsylvania
Unincorporated communities in Pennsylvania